Alex Walter Diggelmann (August 20, 1902 – November 21, 1987) was a Swiss graphic artist and book designer best known for his sports posters.  Diggelmann won three medals in the Olympic Games.

He won a gold medal in 1936 for a poster entitled Arosa I Placard, and a bronze one and a silver one in 1948 for two commercial posters, the "World Championship for Cycling Poster" and the "World Championship for Ice Hockey Poster". He also designed the trophy presented annually to the winners of the UEFA Cup.

Diggelmann is only one of two artists who won three medals in art competition.  (The other was the Danish writer Josef Petersen.)

References

External links
 profile

1902 births
1987 deaths
Swiss graphic designers
Swiss poster artists
Olympic gold medalists in art competitions
Olympic silver medalists in art competitions
Olympic bronze medalists in art competitions
Medalists at the 1948 Summer Olympics
Medalists at the 1936 Summer Olympics
Olympic competitors in art competitions